Dendropsophus studerae is a species of frogs in the family Hylidae.

It is endemic to Quebrangulo, in the State of Alagoas, Brazil. Its specific name honours Anita Studer, a Swiss ornithologist who has been active in trying to save the rainforest.

Its natural habitats are subtropical or tropical seasonally wet or flooded lowland grassland, swamps, intermittent freshwater lakes, and intermittent freshwater marshes.  Dendropsophus studerae have not been observed below 600m above sea level.

References

studerae
Endemic fauna of Brazil
Frogs of South America
Amphibians described in 2003
Taxonomy articles created by Polbot